McCutchen is a surname. Notable people with the surname include:

Andrew McCutchen (born 1986), American baseball player
Daniel McCutchen (born 1982), American baseball player
Monty McCutchen (born 1966), American basketball referee

Places

 McCutchenville, Ohio

See also
 McCutcheon (disambiguation)